The 2021 New Holland World Junior Qualification Event was held from November 22 to 27 at the Saskatoon Granite Curling Club in Saskatoon, Saskatchewan. This one time event was used to select Canada's representatives for the 2022 World Junior Curling Championships, as the 2021 Canadian Junior Curling Championships were cancelled due to the COVID-19 pandemic.

Men

Teams
The teams are listed as follows:

Round robin standings
Final Round Robin Standings

Round robin results

All draws are listed in Central Time (UTC−06:00).

Draw 2
Tuesday, November 23, 8:30 am

Draw 4
Tuesday, November 23, 7:30 pm

Draw 6
Wednesday, November 24, 2:00 pm

Draw 8
Thursday, November 25, 8:30 am

Draw 10
Thursday, November 25, 7:30 pm

Playoffs

Quarterfinals
Friday, November 26, 10:00 am

Semifinals
Friday, November 26, 5:00 pm

Final
Saturday, November 27, 1:00 pm

Women

Teams
The teams are listed as follows:

Round robin standings
Final Round Robin Standings

Round robin results

All draws are listed in Central Time (UTC−06:00).

Draw 1
Monday, November 22, 7:00 pm

Draw 3
Tuesday, November 23, 2:00 pm

Draw 5
Wednesday, November 24, 8:30 am

Draw 7
Wednesday, November 24, 7:30 pm

Draw 9
Thursday, November 25, 2:00 pm

Playoffs

Quarterfinals
Friday, November 26, 10:00 am

Semifinals
Friday, November 26, 5:00 pm

Final
Saturday, November 27, 1:00 pm

References

External links

2021 in Canadian curling
2021 in Saskatchewan
November 2021 sports events in Canada
Curling in Saskatoon